Nord-Gudbrandsdal Deanery is a deanery within the Diocese of Hamar in the Church of Norway. This deanery covers several municipalities in the northwestern part of the diocese. It includes churches in the municipalities of Dovre, Lesja, Lom, Nord-Fron, Sel, Skjåk, and Vågå. The deanery is headquartered at Sel Church in the north side of the town of Otta in Sel Municipality.

History 
On 18 March 1871, a government resolution was passed that divided the old Gudbrandsdalen prosti into two: Nordre Gudbrandsdalen prosti and Søndre Gudbrandsdalen prosti. This resolution went into effect on 1 May 1871. Originally, the new deanery included the churches in the parishes (prestegjeld) of Dovre, Lesja, Skjåk, Lom, and Vågå. In 1910, the parish of Vågå was split into two: Sel and Vågå. In 1922, the spelling of the name was changed from Nordre Gudbrandsdalen prosti to Nord-Gudbrandsdalen prosti (both mean "northern Gudbrandsdalen"). Also in that year, the parish of Sel was moved to the Midtre Gudbrandsdal prosti.  A government resolution of 25 June 1971 ordered that the Midtre Gudbrandsdal prosti (deanery) was to be dissolved and the parishes of Sel and Fron were transferred into the Nord-Gudbrandsdal deanery starting on 1 January 1975. In 1977, the (newly reconstituted) municipality of Sør-Fron was transferred to Sør-Gudbrandsdal prosti. In 2004, the prestegjeld was dissolved within the Church of Norway in favor of linking all parishes in Norway to their municipalities.

Locations

Each municipality is made up of one or more church parishes. Each municipality elects a church council to oversee the churches within the municipality.

See also
List of churches in Hamar#Nord-Gudbrandsdal prosti

References

External links
 Nord-Gudbrandsdal prosti 

Deaneries in Hamar Diocese
Gudbrandsdalen